4,4′-Oxydianiline (ODA) is an organic compound with the formula O(C6H4NH2)2. It is an ether derivative of aniline. This colourless solid is a useful monomer and cross-linking agent for polymers, especially the polyimides, such as Kapton.

Uses 
4,4′-Oxydianiline is used in the production of a wide variety of polymer resins. The primary use lies in the production of polyimide and poly(ester)imide resins. These resins are used for their temperature-resistant properties and are utilized in products including wire enamels, coatings, film, adhesives, insulating varnishes, coated fabrics, flame-retardant fibers, oil sealants and retainers, insulation for cables and printed circuits, and laminates and composite for aerospace vehicles.

Other applications of 4,4′-oxydianiline include the production of poly(amide)imide resins (which are used in the manufacture of heat-resistant wire enamels and coatings), as an intermediate in the manufacture of epoxy resins and adhesives, and in the production of aromatic polyether imides. Its use in the production of polyimine vitrimers has also been proposed.

A specific reaction involving industrial use of 4,4′-oxydianiline is in the production of thermostable poly(amideurea) acids, which can be prepared from 4,4′-oxydianiline, pyromellitic dianhydride, and diisocyanates. These poly(amideurea) acids can be used as intermediates in the syntheses of poly(imideurea)s:

Related compounds
 4,4'-Thiodianiline
 4,4'-Methylenedianiline
 Dapsone

References

External links 
 MSDS Material Safety Data Sheet provided by Sigma-Aldrich.

Anilines
Diphenyl ethers